Wayland Baptist University (Alaska) is an extension of Wayland Baptist University, a private, coeducational Baptist university based in Plainview, Texas. It maintains external campuses in Anchorage and Fairbanks, Alaska.

The Anchorage campus located at 7801 E. 32nd Ave at the corner of E. 32nd Ave. and Old Muldoon Road. The Anchorage campus also operates teaching sites in Wasilla, JBER-Richardson, and JBER-Elmendorf.

The Fairbanks campus was established in 1985 at Eielson Air Force Base as an extension of the Alaska campus in Anchorage and began to operate independently in 1999. The Fairbanks campus also operates teaching sites in Fort Wainwright, AK and North Pole, AK.

Both campuses offer four 11 week terms, with classes during weekday evenings, or on weekends. The Fairbanks campus also offers hybrid classes, which meet face-to-face, online, or a combination of the two.

References

External links
 Wayland Baptist University home page

Wayland Baptist University
Buildings and structures in Anchorage, Alaska
Education in Anchorage, Alaska
Private universities and colleges in Alaska